The canton of Montpellier-3 is an administrative division of the Hérault department, southern France. Its borders were modified at the French canton reorganisation which came into effect in March 2015. Its seat is in Montpellier.

Composition

It consists of the following communes:
Montpellier (partly)

Councillors

References

Cantons of Hérault